Fleischhauer is a German surname. Notable people with the surname include:

Carl-August Fleischhauer (1930–2005), German judge
Georg Fleischhauer (born 1988), German hurdler
Günter Fleischhauer (1928–2002), German musicologist
Ulrich Fleischhauer (1876–1960), Nazi propagandist

German-language surnames